is a Japanese footballer who currently plays as a defender for Honda Lock.

Career statistics

Club
.

Notes

References

External links

1995 births
Living people
Sportspeople from Tochigi Prefecture
Association football people from Tochigi Prefecture
Tokyo University of Agriculture alumni
Japanese footballers
Association football defenders
J3 League players
Japan Football League players
Tochigi SC players
Azul Claro Numazu players
Honda Lock SC players
20th-century Japanese people
21st-century Japanese people